Vyacheslav Vasilyevich Shabunin (born 27 September 1969 in Kamyshlov, Sverdlovsk Oblast) is a Russian middle distance runner who specializes in the 1500 metres.  After a career that took him to three Olympics, he has continued into masters athletics. In 2010 he set world records in the M40 1500 metres, mile run and 3000 metres.

Competition record

Personal bests
800 metres - 1:47.00 min (1996)
1500 metres - 3:32.28 min (2000)
3000 metres - 7:39.24 min (1995)
5000 metres - 13:43.39 min (1994)
Half marathon - 1:01:29 hrs (1996)

References

 

1969 births
Living people
People from Sverdlovsk Oblast
Sportspeople from Sverdlovsk Oblast
Russian male middle-distance runners
Russian male long-distance runners
Russian masters athletes
Olympic male middle-distance runners
Olympic athletes of Russia
Athletes (track and field) at the 1996 Summer Olympics
Athletes (track and field) at the 2000 Summer Olympics
Athletes (track and field) at the 2008 Summer Olympics
Competitors at the 1994 Goodwill Games
World Athletics Championships athletes for Russia
Russian Athletics Championships winners
World record holders in masters athletics